Coldiron or cold iron may refer to:

 Cold iron, historically believed to repel ghosts, fairies, and other supernatural creatures
 "Cold Iron" (poem), a 1910 poem by Rudyard Kipling
 Cold Iron (video game), 2018
 Cold ironing, the process of providing shoreside electrical power to a ship at berth
 "Cold Irons Bound", a 1997 song by Bob Dylan
 Coldiron, Kentucky, United States